This is a list of Members of Parliament (MPs) elected to the 1st parliament  in the reign of King James I in 1604, known as the Blessed Parliament.
The Parliament was summoned on 31 January 1604 and the first session ran from 19 March 1604 to 7 July 1604. The second session began on 5 November 1605 on the day when the Gunpowder Plot was discovered. It ended on 27 May 1606.  The third session began on 18 November 1606 and lasted to 5 July 1607.  The fourth session began on 9 February 1609 and continued to  23 July 1610. It was prorogued to 16 October 1610 and continued to 21 December 1610. It was then prorogued to 9 February 1611 when it was dissolved.

Prior to 1621 there was no official list of members and the 1614 parliamentary list is incomplete. However Browne Willis was able to state that his record for 1604 "is rendered thus perfect from a List sent me by the late Sir Philip Sydenham Bart".

List of constituencies and members

See also
List of parliaments of England

Notes

References

Parliaments of James I of England
1604 in England
1604
1604 in politics